The Macchi M.41 was an Italian flying boat fighter prototype of 1927 designed and manufactured by Macchi. Its production model, the M.41bis, first flown in 1929, was in front line service from 1930 to 1938.

Design and development

M.41
In 1927, the Regia Marina (Italian Royal Navy) held a contest for a replacement for the Macchi M.7ter flying boat fighter. In response, Macchi designed the M.41, based on its Macchi M.26 design of 1924. The M.41 was a wooden, single-seat, single-bay biplane armed with two fixed, forward-firing 7.7-millimeter (0.303-inch) machine guns. It had plywood and fabric skinning, and its wings were of equal span and unstaggered. Its engine, a 313-kilowatt (420-horsepower) Fiat A.20 driving a pusher propeller, was mounted on struts above the hull and below the upper wing, and the aircraft was fitted with an oblique frontal radiator. Like the M.26, it was of very clean aerodynamic design for an aircraft of its type.

In the 1927 contest, the M.41 prototype competed against the SIAI S.58bis. Macchi received no production order for the M.41 and built only the first prototype. Although plans were made for SIAI to produce 97 S.58bis aircraft, these fell through when the Regia Marina decided to save money by re-engining the M.7ter rather than procure any new replacement aircraft in 1927.

M.41 bis
In 1929, the Regia Marina again organized a contest for an M.7 ter replacement. Macchi produced a new version of the M.41, dubbed the M.41 bis, which differed from the M.41 chiefly in having a vertical radiator. It performed better than the SIAI S.58ter in the contest, and this time Macchi was awarded a contract to produce 41 M.41 bis aircraft.

Operational history
Macchi delivered all 41 M.41 bis aircraft, which began to enter service in 1930. They operated in two squadriglie of the 88° Gruppo Autonomo Caccia Marittima, and remained in front-line service until replaced in 1938 by the IMAM Ro.44 floatplane fighter.

Operators

 Regia Marina
 88° Gruppo Autonomo Caccia Marittima

 Spanish Air Force

Specifications (M.41bis)

See also

References

Notes

M.41
1920s Italian fighter aircraft
Biplanes
Single-engined pusher aircraft
Aircraft first flown in 1927